Droga krajowa nr 98 (translates from Polish as national road 98) was route belonging to Polish national roads network.

History

1985–2000 
The first time route 98 was introduced in 1985, as a part of road network reform. It ran from Wadowice through Maków Podhalański, Jordanów, Rabka, Limanowa, Nowy Sącz, Gorlice, Jasło, Krosno, Sanok, Kuźmina and Bircza to Przemyśl until the year 2000, when as a result of another reform the route 98 was decommissioned and replaced with road 28 existing to present day.

2011–2019 
In 2011, after opening the Wrocław motorway bypass the road 98 was commissioned the second time. It ran entirely through Lower Silesian Voivodeship, leading from a junction Kobierzyce with expressway S8 to Długołęka. In 2012 the course of the route has been changed – it began on a crossing with national road 5 in Wrocław and finished on the junction Wrocław Psie Pole with motorway A8 and expressway S8 near the city, following mostly old route of national road 8. Road 98 was treated as an alternative route for motorway bypass, despite fact that A8 is not a toll road.

Since January 1, 2020 route 98 is no longer a part of national roads network. The stretch connecting motorway junction Wrocław Psie Pole with village Długołęka has been reclassified as voivodeship road, with the further section through Wrocław as a gmina road.

References 

98